Lidiya Nikolayevna Fedoseyeva-Shukshina (born 25 September 1938, in Leningrad) is a Russian actress and widow of writer, actor and director Vasily Shukshin. She is the mother of actress and TV presenter Maria Shukshina.

Biography
Lidiya Fedoseyeva was born in Leningrad on September 25, 1938. From 1946 to 1956 she studied in school № 217 (formerly known as Saint Peter's School). Was engaged in the drama club of the House of Cinema under the leadership of Matvey Dubrovin.

In 1964 she graduated from VGIK workshop of Sergei Gerasimov and Tamara Makarova.

She acted in cinema since 1955, her cinematic debut was an uncredited role of a laboratory assistant in the film directed by Anatoly Granik Maksim Perepelitsa. The first major role was played by Lidiya Fedoseyeva in the film Peers (1959).

When working on the set of the 1964 movie What is it, the sea?, Lidiya met her future husband, writer, actor and director Vasily Shukshin, whom she married in the same year. The actress got her breakthrough in the films of her husband, in which she played folk heroines - simple Russian women, sincere and trustful, endowed with inner strength, such are Nyura in the picture Happy Go Lucky (1972) and Lyuba Baykalova in the drama The Red Snowball Tree (1973).

After Shukshin's death in 1974, Lidiya Fedoseyeva took the double surname Fedoseyeva-Shukshina.

In the 1970s films, the actress continued the figurative line of the Shukshin heroines, starring in the films Tran-Grass (1976) by Sergei Nikonenko and Call Me to the Bright Side (1977) by Stanislav Lubshin and Herman Lavrov.

Fedoseyeva-Shukshina acted in many historical films: The Youth of Peter the Great (1980), Demidovs (1983), Viva gardemarines! (1991), Petersburg Secrets (1994, 1998), Countess Sheremetev (1994), Prince Yuri Dolgoruky (1998), etc. Popular screen adaptations of novels with her appearance included Dead Souls (1984), Evenings on a Farm near Dikanka (2001) by Nikolai Gogol, Little Tragedies (1979) by Alexander Pushkin, Road to Calvary (1977) by Alexei Tolstoy, The Kreutzer Sonata (1987) by Leo Tolstoy, and others.

She played in Polish films Until the Last Drop of Blood (1979) and Ballad of Yanushik (1987).

Other noted movies where the actress played Twelve Chairs (1976), Could One Imagine? (1980), Love with Privileges (1989).

In total, she has over 80 roles in the cinema.

Between 1974-1993, the actress worked in the National Film Actors' Theatre.

Lidiya Fedoseyeva-Shukshina is the president and chairman of the jury of the All-Russian Film Festival "Viva, Cinema of Russia!".

Personal life
From the first marriage with actor Vyacheslav Voronin, the actress has daughter Anastasia. From the marriage with Vasily Shukshin she has two daughters   Maria and Olga. Maria, having graduated from the Institute of Foreign Languages, became a well-known film actress and TV presenter. Olga graduated from VGIK and Literary Institute. Lidiya  was married 5 times.

Honors
In 1984, the actress was awarded the title People’s Artist of the RSFSR. She was awarded the Order "For Merit to the Fatherland", 4th Degree (1998) for her great personal contribution to the development of motion pictures, and the Medal for Services to Society (2009). For the role in the film The Ballad of Yanushik (1988) Fedoseyeva-Shukshina was distinguished by the Polish Order of Arts.

Selected filmography
 1955 — Two Captains (Два капитана) as assistant
 1956 —  Maksim Perepelitsa (Максим Перепелица) as laboratory assistant
 1959 — Female Age-Mates (Сверстницы) as Tanya
 1971 —  Dauria (Даурия) as matchmaker
 1972 —  Happy Go Lucky (Печки-лавочки) as Nyura
 1974 —  The Red Snowball Tree (Калина красная) as Lyuba Baykalova
 1975 —  They Fought for Their Country (Они сражались за Родину) as Glasha
 1976 —  Twelve Chairs (12 стульев) as Madame Gritsatsuyeva
 1979 —  Little Tragedies (Маленькие трагедии) as Ekaterina Pavlovna
 1980 —  The Youth of Peter the Great (Юность Петра) as matchmaker
 1981  — Could One Imagine? (Вам и не снилось…) as Vera Vasilievna Lavochkina
 1983 —  Quarantine (Карантин) as circus cashier
 1984 —  Dead Souls (Мёртвые души) as Lady, just nice
 1986 —  Along the main street with orchestra (По главной улице с оркестром) as Lidiya Ivanovna
 1987 —  The Kreutzer Sonata (Крейцерова соната) as Liza's mother
 1991 —  Viva Gardes-Marines! as Ekaterina Chernysheva

References

External links

1938 births
Living people
Actresses from Saint Petersburg
Soviet film actresses
People's Artists of the RSFSR
Honored Artists of the RSFSR
Gerasimov Institute of Cinematography alumni
Saint Peter's School (Saint Petersburg) alumni